The Argentina–Paraguay border is the line that limits the territories of Argentina and Paraguay. This boundary is solely defined by three major rivers: the Pilcomayo, Paraná and Paraguay, being one of the largest natural borders in the world. The capital of Paraguay, Asunción, lies on one of the banks of the Paraguay River, which borders Argentina. The capital of Argentina is Buenos Aires, which lies on one of the banks of the River Plate, made by major Paraguayan tributaries. Argentina is the country which Paraguay has the largest border with, being about 1,689 km long. It is Argentina's second largest border, after the Argentina–Chile border.

Some of the traditional Argentine-Paraguayan border checkpoints:

 Misión La Paz (South of Santa Victoria Este) - Pozo Hondo (North of Doctor P. Peña)
 Clorinda - Puerto Falcón
 Formosa - Alberdi
 Puerto Cano - Pilar
 Paso de la Patria - Paso de Patria
 Ituzaingó - Ayolas
 Posadas - Encarnación
 Puerto Iguazú - Presidente Franco

Isla del Cerrito is located at the confluence of the Paraguay and Paraná Rivers.

See also
 Argentina–Paraguay relations
 Paraguayan Argentines
 Humid Chaco
 Culture of Argentina
 Culture of Paraguay
 Argentina national football team
 Paraguay national football team

References

 
Borders of Argentina
Borders of Paraguay
International borders